Association Football Club St. Austell  is a football club based in St Austell, Cornwall, England in the United Kingdom.

History
A.F.C St Austell were among the founding members of the South Western League in 1951. In over 50 years they claimed the title once, in 1968–69, and achieved four runner-up spots between 1963 and 1973. They remained in their original competition until 2007 when they joined the newly formed South West Peninsula League Division One West. In 2009–10 season A.F.C. St Austell gained promotion to the South West Peninsula Premier League by finishing runners up. A second success since came in the 2014–15 season when the club were crowned champions; their first league trophy since 1968–69 season.

They have played intermittently in the FA Competitions over the decades. Their best performance in the FA Cup dates back to 1947–48 when they made the third qualifying round, while in the FA Vase their most successful is the 2014–15 season, where the club reached the semi-finals, losing 2–1 on aggregate to Glossop North End. They also won the league and cup double.

In 2012, floodlights were installed on the ground, enabling the club to compete once again in the FA Cup and FA Vase tournaments.

In 2015 the club applied to take the step to the next tier of football but due to a failed ground inspection the application was denied by the FA.

2016 saw the team lift the league Cup.

2018-2019 saw the side come 5th level on points with Saltash and make the League Cup quarter final and the Senior Cup semi final. They also made it to 4th round of the FA Vase losing to eventual winners Chertsey Town.

To the start of the new 2019 -2020 season the club appoint Lee Hodges and Chris Todd as 1st Team Manager and Assistant Manager who left prior to the season starting and were replaced by St Austell favourites Chris Knight and James Powell for their 2nd spell managing the club.

The 2019 -2020 season was cut short from the world pandemic of Coronavirus, the season was declared null and void. They were in 2nd place at the time.

Mark Ferguson-Smith and Steve Wheatley were made the new manager and coach for the 2020 - 2021 season.

Season history

Ground
A.F.C. St Austell play their home games at Poltair Park, Trevarthian Road, St Austell, Cornwall, PL25 4LR. www.afcstaustell.co.uk

Honours

League honours
South West Peninsula League Premier Division
Champions (1): 2014-15
South West Peninsula League Division One west
Runners Up (1): 2009-10
South Western League
Champions (1): 1968–69
Runners-up (4):  1963–64, 1965–66, 1971–72, 1972–73

Cup honours
Cornwall Senior Cup
Winners (14): 1912, 1913, 1914, 1934, 1939, 1946, 1947, 1949, 1964, 1969, 1972, 2009, 2014, 2015
Cornwall Charity Cup
Winners (3): 1908, 1914, 1932
League Cup
Winners (1): 2016

Players

First-team squad

References

External links

Football clubs in Cornwall
Football clubs in England
Association football clubs established in 1890
South West Peninsula League
1890 establishments in England
A.F.C>